Shqiprim Izir Taipi (born 19 February 1997) is an Albanian professional footballer who plays as a central midfielder for Albanian club FK Kukesi.

Club career

Shkëndija
In June 2015, Taipi signed his first professional contract with Shkëndija as a 18-year old, inking for the next three years, and he returned to his parent club Shkëndija for the next season. On 8 August 2016, he debuted by playing full-90 minutes in the 2–1 win over Sileks.

Loan at Horizont Turnovo
Then he began his professional career as a loanee at fellow top flight side Horizont Turnovo, where he played 21 games in the 2015–16 season. On 13 September 2015, he made his professional debut by appearing in the last minutes of a 5–1 away defeat to Vardar.

Loan at Shkupi
On 2 July 2017, Taipi was loaned again this time at Shkupi, on a six-month loan. He was presented along with fellow loanee Shpend Asani and took squad number 22. On 13 August 2017, he played his first game for the club by starting in the 1–1 draw versus Akademija Pandev. He played 14 games for the club, 10 as starter before leaving in January of the following year.

Loan at Prishtina
On 31 January 2018, Taipi was sent on loan at Football Superleague of Kosovo club Prishtina for the remaining part of 2017–18 season. He played 12 matches in the league as Prishtina finished runner-up. On 27 May 2018, he won his first trophy after Prishtina defeated Vëllaznimi, on penalty shootouts to clinch the 2017–18 Kosovar Cup.

Skënderbeu Korçë
On 19 January 2019, Taipi signed a two and a half year contract with Kategoria Superiore club Skënderbeu Korçë. Three days later, he made his debut with Skënderbeu Korçë in the 2018–19 Albanian Cup second round against Besëlidhja Lezhë after being named in the starting line-up. He made his first Kategoria Superiore appearance on 25 January after coming on as a substitute at 46th minute in place of Arnaud Guedj in a 0–1 minimal home defeat against Partizani Tirana.

International career
Taipi has been called only once by Albania U17 for a training camp.

Personal life
Taipi was born in Vranje, FR Yugoslavia to Albanian parents from Veliki Trnovac, a village near Bujanovac and is the younger brother of professional footballer Gjelbrim Taipi, who plays for Albanian club Kukësi and the Kosovo national team.

Career statistics

Club

Honours
Prishtina
Kosovar Cup: 2017–18

References

External links

1997 births
Living people
People from Vranje
Albanian footballers
Albania youth international footballers
Albanian expatriate footballers
Albanian expatriate sportspeople in North Macedonia
Albanian expatriate sportspeople in Kosovo
Kosovan footballers
Kosovan expatriate footballers
Kosovan expatriate sportspeople in North Macedonia
Kosovan expatriate sportspeople in Albania
Association football midfielders
Macedonian First Football League players
KF Shkëndija players
FK Horizont Turnovo players
FK Shkupi players
Football Superleague of Kosovo players
FC Prishtina players
Kategoria Superiore players
KF Skënderbeu Korçë players
FK Kukësi players